Hiram P. Lodge is a fictional character in the Archie Comics. He is married to Hermione Lodge and they have a daughter, Veronica Lodge. He is an industrialist and the CEO of his multi-billion-dollar company, Lodge Industries. Hiram himself is a multi-billionaire and the richest man in Riverdale.

Bob Montana, the creator of the original Archie characters, knew the Lodges, a Massachusetts Brahmin political family because he painted a mural for them. Montana used that name when he created the character of Hiram Lodge. A villainous version of Hiram is portrayed by Mark Consuelos in Riverdale.

History 
An ongoing storyline in the Archie Comics is Mr. Lodge's feud with Archie Andrews and disapproval of Archie dating Veronica. Hiram tries to avoid Archie because whenever he visits the Lodge mansion, something goes wrong. He allows the pair to date, because deep-down he knows Archie treats Veronica well. In multiple stories, Archie saves Mr. Lodge from thieves, blackmailers, and underhanded business rivals, causing Hiram to begin to accept Archie. On one occasion, he asks Archie and Jughead to act like they are his sons to secure a business deal with clients from a culture where people do not respect a person without sons. Taking advantage, the teens drive away in Lodge's new car and boss around Veronica and Smithers. A typhoon breaks out when the clients attempt to leave and a tree breaks and is about to fall on them until Archie and Jughead save the day. This enables Lodge to secure the deal, and, in his joy, he says, "You did great, sons!", much to Veronica and Smither's chagrin.

Hiram Lodge is a millionaire, but in one story, Veronica contradicts states that "Daddy has billions." This is likely due to the extreme rise of wealth in the real world since the introduction of the Archie Comics, which means that Hiram would have to be a billionaire to maintain the pretense that he is one of the richest men in the world. In the comics, this is explained by the take-over of the Blossom corporation, owned by Cheryl Blossom's father. He is usually portrayed as an industrialist, rather than a financier or banker, and is frequently involved in international business ventures.  He has a keen eye for unusual business opportunities that other people write off. In one story, a businessman thought he had outsmarted Mr. Lodge by selling him a garbage dump for $2,000, Lodge easily retorted that he had covered the dump with artificial snow and turned it into a ski resort, which made him over $2 million in its first year of operation.

The stories about his childhood are contradictory. Some suggest he was born to old money and is descended from the founders of Riverdale. Others state that he built his fortune from that of his in-laws. He had also served in the Army at some point in his life.

Although politics are rarely mentioned, one story-line hinted that Hiram was a conservative.  In the storyline, the Archie had been shrunken and was forced to use a paper airplane to fly to the other side of the room. When it was suggested that they lean to the left, Veronica quipped that her dad hated anyone who leaned to the left.

Note: In some 'Archie' stories dating from the 1960s, he is referred to as J. P. Lodge, and in his first appearance in Pep Comics #31, he is referred to as Burton K. Lodge. One story gives his name as  Mark

Despite his age, he remains physically fit, which in one story, he attributes to his having to chase Archie away.

In other media

Animation 
 Hiram appears sporadically in Archie's Weird Mysteries (1999–2000), voiced by John Michael Lee. His dislike of Archie is notably toned down, as they don't interact much on-screen. In the episode "Teen Out of Time", it is revealed that Mr. Lodge was the one who gave Pop Tate a bank loan to open his diner.
 Hiram appears briefly in the direct-to-video film, The Archies in JugMan (2002), with Lee reprising his role. Notably, his wife appears in the film too despite not being present in the TV series.

Live action 
 Hiram appears in the 1990 television film, Archie: To Riverdale and Back Again, portrayed by James Noble. He is the main antagonist and anti-hero who wants to evict Pop Tate from his soda shop, under the pretext of expanding Reggie Mantle's gym. Just like in the comic books, he doesn't want Veronica dating Archie, as he finds them incompatible, and seeing his daughter flirt with him only emboldens him to go through with his plans.
 Hiram appears as a major antagonist on the CW series Riverdale, portrayed by Mark Consuelos. The pilot episode establishes that he is in New York City on trial for fraud and embezzlement, leading Hermione and Veronica to move to Riverdale to escape his notoriety. He and Fred Andrews were rivals in school, as Hiram stole Hermione from Fred and later married her. Hermione continues to help Hiram run his business and criminal empire from behind bars. In the second season, Hiram is released and returns to Riverdale, establishing himself as a threatening and powerful presence in the town. Just like the comic books and animated series, he hates Archie and doesn't want him to date Veronica. In the fourth season, he reveals he was born Jaime Luna but changed his name due to the bad reputation of the Luna family. In the fifth season episode "Chapter Eighty-Eight: Citizen Lodge", he tells Reggie Mantle about his father Javier Luna, who moved to Riverdale to work in palladium mines but ended up shining shoes. Hiram got tired of living in poverty and went to work for the gangster Vittorio "Vito" Alto, eventually taking over Vito's business when Vito disappeared.
 Consuelos reprises the role in the episode "Chapter Thirteen: Come Together" from the first season of Katy Keene, a spin-off of Riverdale.

References

Comics characters introduced in 1942
Archie Comics characters
Fictional bullies
Fictional businesspeople
Animated human characters
Male characters in animation
Male characters in comics
Male characters in television
Characters created by Bob Montana